Ploshchad Lenina ( (Square of the Lenin) ) is a station on the Leninskaya Line of the Novosibirsk Metro. It opened on December 28, 1985.

Novosibirsk Metro stations
Railway stations in Russia opened in 1985
1985 establishments in the Soviet Union
Tsentralny City District, Novosibirsk
Railway stations located underground in Russia